Kim Wilkie (born 3 June 1959), Australian
politician, was an Australian Labor Party member of the
Australian House of Representatives from October 1998 to December 2007, representing the Electoral Division of Swan, Western Australia. He was born in Perth, Western Australia, and was a Youth Employment Placement Officer, prison officer and farmer before entering politics. He was a member of South Perth City Council 1993–98.

In the 2007 Federal Election a slight swing of 0.19% towards the Liberal Party meant Wilkie became the only incumbent Labor member to lose his seat (in Cowan, the only other seat Labor lost in the 2007 election, incumbent Graham Edwards did not contest the seat as he retired from federal politics at that time), defeated by Liberal candidate Steve Irons with a margin of 0.11%.

References

1959 births
Living people
Australian Labor Party members of the Parliament of Australia
Labor Left politicians
Members of the Australian House of Representatives
Members of the Australian House of Representatives for Swan
Prison officers
21st-century Australian politicians
20th-century Australian politicians